Bugulma (Bögelmä) is a town in the Republic of Tatarstan, Russia. Population:

Administrative and municipal status
Within the framework of administrative divisions, Bugulma serves as the administrative center of Bugulminsky District, even though it is not a part of it. As an administrative division, it is incorporated separately as the town of republic significance of Bugulma—an administrative unit with the status equal to that of the districts. As a municipal division, the town of republic significance of Bugulma is incorporated within Bugulminsky Municipal District as Bugulma Urban Settlement.

Economy
Ak Bars Aero has its head office at Bugulma Airport.

Notable people
Bugulma is the birthplace of noted Tatar singer Alsou.

Jaroslav Hasek in 1918 was the governor of the town Bugulma.

References

Notes

Sources

External links
Official website of Bugulma 
Unofficial website of Bugulma 
Bugulma Business Directory 

Cities and towns in Tatarstan
Bugulminsky Uyezd